The IAU Trail World Championships are annual trail running World Championships, from 2007 up to 2015 was biennial, held for the first time in Huntsville, United States in 2007 and organised by International Association of Ultrarunners.

Editions

Results

Men

Women

See also
 IAU 50 km World Championships
 IAU 100 km World Championships
 IAU 24 Hour World Championship

References

External links
 Official web site of IAU (governing body for ultra running)
 Official web site of ITRA (governing body for trail running)

 
Trail running competitions
Trail
Ultramarathons
Recurring sporting events established in 2007